Tobias Emanuel ("Toby") Capwell FSA (born ) is an American historian who lives and works in London. His principal interest is in European arms and armour of the medieval and Renaissance periods (roughly, the 12th century to the 16th). He was Curator of Arms and Armour at the Wallace Collection in London. He has written and spoken extensively on both the historical and the practical aspects of his subject. He is a skilled jouster, and has claimed to be the world's only jousting curator.

Biography

Capwell's interest in chivalric combat was aroused when he visited the Metropolitan Museum of Art in New York at the age of four or five, and was so impressed by an exhibit of a man in full plate armour on horseback that he knew that that was what he wanted to be when he grew up. He began to learn to ride at the age of eleven. Eight years later, he took on his first opponent, in front of three thousand people. He has since jousted many times in Europe and America, helping to revive jousting as a competitive sport and not just a reenactment spectacle. In 1996, he moved to England as a founding member of the Royal Armouries jousting team. In 2002, that team won the Sword of Honour at a competition organised by the Royal Armouries. In 2005, he was a founding member of the Order of the Crescent, another jousting team. That year, he won the 'Scottish Sword of Chivalry' in a three-week tournament held by the National Trust for Scotland and the Royal Armouries. In 2006, he became 'Queen's Champion' by winning the Royal Armouries' Queen's Golden Jubilee joust. In 2008, he won a competition held at the Bern Historical Museum in Switzerland designed to reproduce a 15th-century pas d'armes; during which, over eleven days, he defended the field against three opponents; running 132 joust passes ('courses') on horseback and fighting 22 longsword combats on foot.

At the same time, he was pursuing an academic career. In 2004, Leeds University awarded him a PhD for a thesis on early English armour. Few individual pieces, let alone full suits, of such armour, either for warfare or for sport (tournaments), have survived. He therefore based his researches not only on those, but also on Continental armour of the time, documentary sources, illustrations, artworks, and especially English monumental brasses and funerary sculptures, the last of which often have highly accurate detail.

In 2012, archaeologists discovered the burial place of King Richard III of England (1452–1485), who had been killed at the Battle of Bosworth Field. Capwell was a member of the multidisciplinary academic team which studied the remains. In 2015, he was one of the two mounted men in full armour who escorted the king's coffin to his reburial in Leicester Cathedral.

He is Curator of Arms and Armour at the Wallace Collection, London, and on 2 June 2011 was elected a Fellow of the Society of Antiquaries.

Publications and media appearances
Capwell has published several books relating to his speciality. Among them is an authoritative trilogy of works, Armour of the English Knight 1400–1450 (2015), Armour of the English Knight 1450–1500 (2021), and Armour of the English Knight: continental armour in England 1435–1500 (2022). Reviewing the first volume in The English Historical Review, David Palliser wrote that it "should revolutionise the study of early fifteenth-century armour, and it is one which document-based historians would neglect to their cost. [...] [He] is that rare scholar, an internationally renowned expert in his field, who is also a seasoned practitioner of combat in full plate armour, one who can speak with real authority on armour as a practical and functional aspect of medieval life".

He has taken part in scientific experiments designed to measure the effectiveness of the couched lance as a weapon in knightly combat.

English sculptor Henry Moore (1898-1986) was a frequent visitor to the Wallace Collection, and drew inspiration from it. In his later years, he produced several sculptures based on helmets displayed in that museum. In 2019, Capwell and Hannah Higham, in a book titled The Helmet Heads, analysed those sculptures from the perspective of the original helmets.

His television appearances have included Timewatch: The Greatest Knight (2008, BBC2, contributor), The Private Life of a Masterpiece: Caravaggio: The Taking of Christ (2010, BBC2, contributor), Metalworks: The Knight's Tale (2012, BBC4, writer and presenter), Richard III: The New Evidence (2014, Channel 4, presenter and armour advisor), and A Stitch in Time (2018, BBC4, contributor).

List of publications
Capwell's publications include:
 
 
  Apollo Magazine Book of the Year 2012.
 
  Military History Monthly Illustrated Book of the Year 2017.

References

Further reading
 
 
 Atlas, Lestra (25 June 2020). Review of a lecture by Tobias Capwell on the Knight in Armour in Life and Afterlife for the Oxford Medieval Studies Programme at TORCH (with a link to the full recording). Retrieved 9 August 2020.

External links
 
 "Tobias Capwell" publications indexed by Google Scholar
 
 
 
 

Living people
Year of birth missing (living people)
1970s births
People from Petaluma, California
American military historians
American curators
Jousting
Fellows of the Society of Antiquaries of London
Historians from California
Historians of weapons